She Came from the Woods is a 2022 American horror film written by Erik Bloomquist and Carson Bloomquist, directed by Erik Bloomquist and starring Cara Buono, Clare Foley, Spencer List and William Sadler.  It is based on the 2017 short film of the same name.

Cast
Cara Buono as Heather McAlister
Clare Foley as Lauren
Spencer List as Peter McAlister
William Sadler as Gilbert McAlister
Michael Park as Officer Matthews
Tyler Elliot Burke as Shawn McCalister
Adam Weppler as Dylan
Ehad Berisha as Mike
Dan Leahy as Ben
Giselle Torres as Veronica
Sienna Hubert-Ross as Ashley
Emily Keefe as Kellie
Erik Bloomquist as Danny

Production
In June 2021, it was announced that filming wrapped in Connecticut.

In July 2022, it was announced that Blue Finch Films acquired world sales rights to the film.

Release
She Came from the Woods premiered at FrightFest on August 27, 2022.  The film was then released theatrically on February 10, 2023.

Reception
Review aggregator website Rotten Tomatoes reported an approval rating of 70% based on 19 reviews.

Bobby LePire of Film Threat rated the film a 9 out of 10, calling it "a frightening, funny flick that perfectly pays homage to the classics and cult favorites of the early years of the slasher genre."

References

External links